Brunswick River is an open mature wave dominated barrier estuary, located in the Northern Rivers region of New South Wales, Australia.

Course and features
Brunswick River rises on the eastern slopes of Mount Jerusalem, at Palmwoods, near Uki, and flows generally east southeast, before reaching its mouth at the Coral Sea of the South Pacific Ocean, at Brunswick Heads. The river descends  over its  course; through the towns of Mullumbimby and Brunswick Heads.

Brunswick River is impounded by a lake at Tyagarah, where the local tea trees give the lake water a brown tint. This lake becomes a popular swimming hole in the summer months and is used by naturists who come down from Tyagrah Beach.

The north arm of the river, called Marshalls Creek, flows through Ocean Shores, Billinudgel, Ocean Shores North and The Pocket. Marshalls Creek also connects to a canal in Ocean Shores North and South Golden Beach.  The south arm of the river, called Simpsons Creek, flows through Brunswick Heads, Bayside and Tyagarah.

Between Brunswick Heads and Ocean Shores, the Pacific Highway crosses the river.

The northern bank at the mouth of the river is the northern extent of the Cape Byron Marine Park.

See also

 List of rivers of Australia

References

External links
 

 

Rivers of New South Wales
Northern Rivers